Circus Beely or What's Going On at the Beely Circus? (German: Was ist los im Zirkus Beely?) is a 1927 German silent thriller film directed by and starring Harry Piel.

The film's sets were designed by the art director Kurt Richter.

Cast
 Harry Piel as Harry Peel 
 Charly Berger as Allan Kean  
 Eugen Burg as Zirkusmanager  
 Fritz Greiner as Kriminalkommissar Bull  
 Erich Kaiser-Titz as Doktor Oskar Waldow  
 Ilona Karolewna as Rose Jackson  
 Max Ralph-Ostermann as Robert Jackson  
 Hanni Weisse as Anita de Moran

References

Bibliography
 Grange, William. Cultural Chronicle of the Weimar Republic. Scarecrow Press, 2008.

External links

1927 films
Films of the Weimar Republic
Films directed by Harry Piel
German silent feature films
1920s thriller films
German thriller films
German black-and-white films
Nero-Film films
Silent thriller films
1920s German films